Jerusalem–Yitzhak Navon Railway Station (Tahanat HaRakevet Yerushalaim–Yitzhak Navon), originally named Jerusalem–HaUma railway station is an Israel Railways passenger terminal in Jerusalem, located at 6 Shazar Avenue.

The station is the eastern terminus of the Tel Aviv–Jerusalem railway. It is located across from Binyanei HaUma and constitutes part of a major public transportation hub, being situated adjacent to the Jerusalem Central Bus Station as well as next to a station serving current and future lines of the Jerusalem Light Rail.

The station is named after Jerusalem native Yitzhak Navon, the fifth President of Israel.

History
Construction of the station began in 2007 and was completed in 2018 at a cost of about NIS 500 million (appx. US$140 million).

2,674,840 passengers boarded or disembarked at the station in 2019, making it the 16th busiest station in the country overall at the time. As electrification works progressed northwards along the line, direct services from Tel Aviv were made possible without the need for a transfer at Ben-Gurion Airport and as a result the station's ridership rankings rose further – making it the fifth-busiest railway station in the country and the busiest outside of Tel Aviv (immediately above the previous holder of this title, Haifa Hof HaCarmel) with 1,651,659 passengers boarding or disembarking in 2020.

In 2021, 3,598,443 passengers embarked and disembarked, not only surpassing the (2019) pre-COVID traffic numbers, but also making Navon station the fourth-busiest in the network, above Tel Aviv University.

Station structure

The underground portion of the station is built as a pylon tri-vault. The side vaults each host one of the two island platforms, and are linked by three pairs of overpasses to the central vault.

The lion's share of the underground portion is home to vast logistical and operating areas. The station can double as a shelter in case of a conventional, biological or chemical attack, being able to provide refuge for 5,000 people. Due to the station's vast depth, its underground portion has large ventilation systems pulling in air directly from the surface level, which are also capable of quickly sucking out air in the event of a fire.

Future plans
As of 2022, additional surface entrances from the east and south are being added as part of a major urban re-development plan being carried out in the vicinity of the station.

There is a proposed plan to extend the railway from the station towards the Jerusalem–Malha railway station, via a new underground station in central Jerusalem and another underneath the historic Jerusalem-Khan train station.

Station layout
Platform numbers increase in a North-to-South direction

Ridership

Station lines

See also
Transportation in Israel
Jerusalem–Malha railway station

References

External links

 
Video of the construction site (December 2011).
Architectural renderings by Barchana Architects.

Railway stations in Jerusalem
Railway stations located underground
Railway stations opened in 2018